Podgornaya is a rural locality (a village) in Porechenskoye Rural Settlement, Vashkinsky District, Vologda Oblast, Russia. The population was 11 as of 2002.

Geography 
Podgornaya is located 58 km northwest of Lipin Bor (the district's administrative centre) by road. Kharbovo is the nearest rural locality.

References 

Rural localities in Vashkinsky District